"Refugees" is a song written by Danny McNamara and Richard McNamara of the English alternative rock band Embrace. The song was originally recorded by the band as a track for their eponymous sixth studio album, Embrace, where it appears as the third track on the album. "Refugees" was first released as the Embrace track, but debuting on the namesake seventh extended play, Refugees, which was released in promotion of Embrace two months prior. It appears as the opening track on the EP. A "Refugees" promotional single, boasting a radio edit of the song, was sent to UK Modern rock radio in January 2014, in promotion of both Refugees and Embrace.

Music video
A music video for "Refugees" was premiered on 13 January 2014 on video hosting service Vevo. The 5-minute video, directed by Richard McNamara and starring the McNamara brothers, was released parallel to the official announcement of Refugees and Embrace.

Track listing

Personnel
Adapted from Refugees liner notes.

Embrace
Mickey Dale – keyboards, string arrangements, backing vocals
Steve Firth – bass
Mike Heaton – drum kit, percussion, backing vocals
Danny McNamara – lead vocals, acoustic guitar
Richard McNamara – vocals, guitars, keyboard, percussion, production

Additional personnel
Nick Watson - mixing

Release history

Promotional

References

Embrace (English band) songs
Rock ballads
2014 songs
2014 singles
Cooking Vinyl singles
Songs written by Danny McNamara
Songs written by Richard McNamara